Luis Andrés Caicedo de la Cruz (born May 12, 1979) is an Ecuadorian retired footballer.

Club career
Caicedo began his career in Olimpico. However, he only played there for a year and was loaned out to Olmedo. His great skill for center midfield soon impressed Ecuadorian teams when he played for Olmedo on loan for a year.

In April 1999, Caicedo joined Universidad Católica signing for a year. He was soon attracting Olmedo for his good play.

In February 2000, Caicedo signed with Olmedo permanently. He was soon able to consolidate himself as first choice center midfielder for the team. Caicedo scored many goals for Olmedo which made him one of the most important players Olmedo had along with José Luis Perlaza and Omar Ledesma. He is currently the team's top scorer with 7 goals in the Ecuadorian Serie A 2009.

International career
Caicedo was called up by former coach Luis Fernando Suárez to play in the Copa América 2007 for Ecuador in summer 2007. During a training session, he unluckily got injured and could not play the tournament. He was replaced by Pedro Quiñónez for the tournament. He also played in the 3-1 friendly match loss to the United States.

References

External links
 

Luis Caicedo at Footballdatabase

1979 births
Living people
Association football midfielders
Ecuadorian footballers
Ecuador international footballers
Ecuadorian Serie A players
C.D. Universidad Católica del Ecuador footballers
C.D. Olmedo footballers
C.S.D. Macará footballers
Barcelona S.C. footballers
L.D.U. Portoviejo footballers
Delfín S.C. footballers
Sportspeople from Esmeraldas, Ecuador